David Turley, better known as Phreak, is an American League of Legends esports commentator for Riot Games. He has one of the longest careers of an esports commentator in the North American League of Legends Championship Series and has cast in several of the largest major international tournaments.

Early life 
Turley graduated from the University of California, San Diego (UCSD) with a degree in economics.

Career
Phreak's casting activities started in the Warcraft 3 scene, winning Blizzard Battle Report Contests in 2006. He was a professional Warcraft 3 player.

Phreak is a League of Legends caster and community member who works for Riot Games. Phreak was also a Platinum rated summoner in season one, and Diamond rated in seasons two and three, which lends credibility to his videos and commentating work. Phreak is responsible for videos released by Riot Games, such as the Champion Spotlights and Patch Previews. As of March 30, 2020 Phreak was a Gold rated summoner after achieving Platinum or Diamond the previous five seasons.

He provided the voice of a man training Bart, Milhouse, Nelson, Martin and Sophie to be gamers on the Simpsons episode "E My Sports".

References

1987 births
Living people
League of Legends commentators
Riot Games people